Purple Pyramid Records is a sub-label to Cleopatra Records that focuses on progressive rock and psychedelic music. The label began in 2000 with a series of releases by guitarist Allan Holdsworth, Jon Anderson, and Hawkwind co-founder Nik Turner. The label expanded its roster with releases by Yes, Rick Wakeman, Steve Howe, Santana, Amon Düül II, Nektar, Brainticket, Tangerine Dream, Alan Davey, L. Shankar, and Quicksilver Messenger Service as well as projects by producer Billy Sherwood dubbed The Prog Collective, (featuring members of Asia, King Crimson, Mahavishnu Orchestra, and Gong), and The Fusion Syndicate (featuring Rick Wakeman, Steve Stevens, Billy Cobham, and Steve Morse).

History
In 2011, the label partnered with prog rock band Nektar for a 2 CD collection called Retrospektive, followed by the covers album Spoonful of Time in 2012 alongside reissues of the band’s catalog. The new album, Time Machine, was released in 2013 and was the band's final album with singer Roye Albrighton, who died in 2016.

Similar revitalization efforts led to studio albums by Brainticket in 2015 (Past, Present & Future), and Nik Turner (Space Gypsy in 2013, Space Fusion Odyssey in 2015). Meanwhile, the label has continued to grow, adding Captain Beyond, Omega, Bobby Kimball, Jerry Goodman, Damo Suzuki, Harvey Mandel, and Larry Wallis to its roster.

Purple Pyramid has worked with a number of modern, neo-prog bands such as Hedersleben and XNA as well as a host of bands who participated in the massive 6-CD box set Space Rock: An Interstellar Traveler's Guide, including Ozric Tentacles, Melting Euphoria, Øresund Space Collective, and It's Not Night: It's Space.

See also
 List of record labels

References

External links
 Official website
 discogs.com
 AllMusic

American independent record labels
Record labels established in 2000